Adelopomorpha glabra is a species of beetles in the family Carabidae, the only species in the genus Adelopomorpha.

References

Licininae
Monotypic Carabidae genera